Niels Juel (1629–1697) was a Danish-Norwegian admiral.

Niels Juel may also refer to:
 HDMS Niels Juel (1918), a coastal defense ship of the Danish Royal Navy
 Niels Juel-class corvette, a ship class of the Danish Royal Navy
 Statue of Niels Juel, an 1881 statue in Copenhagen, Denmark

See also
 HDMS Niels Juel, a list of ships of the Danish Royal Navy
 Juel (disambiguation)
 Juel (surname)
 Niels (disambiguation)
 Niels Juel Simonsen (1846–1906), Danish opera singer
 Thott Mansion or Niels Juel's Mansion, a 1680s mansion in Copenhagen, Denmark